Mireille Havet ( 4 October 1898, Médan – 21 March 1932, Crans-Montana, Switzerland) was a French poet, diarist, novelist, and lyricist.

She wrote lyrics for songs composed by John Alden Carpenter and intended for Éva Gauthier. She wrote a novel, Carnaval, published in 1923. She was friends with Jean Cocteau and Colette, who referred to her as "la petite poyétesse".

She was openly lesbian.

Her diary, which she kept from 1913 to 1929, was only found again in 1995, and published in 2003.

On 29 January 2009, a public square was named after her in Paris.

References

1898 births
1932 deaths
People from Yvelines
French lesbian writers
French LGBT poets
French LGBT novelists
French women novelists
French women poets
20th-century French poets
20th-century French novelists
20th-century French women writers
20th-century LGBT people